Fayzabad is a district situated in the eastern part of Jowzjan province, Afghanistan. It borders Aqcha District to the west, Mardyan District to the north, Balkh Province to the east and Sar-e Pol Province to the south. The population is 56,000 (2011). The district center is the village of Fayzabad. It is situated in the northern part of the district, a few miles north of the main Sheberghan - Mazari Sharif road.

District Map 
AIMS District Map

References 

Districts of Jowzjan Province